Fairfield, Connecticut has a total of 16 public schools. There are a total of seven private elementary schools, two private high schools, and two private universities located in Fairfield.

Fairfield public schools 
Fairfield's public schools are governed by a large administrative body, as well as a nine-member elected Board of Education.

Elementary schools 
 Burr Elementary School - Established 2004
 Holland Hill School
 Jennings School - Established 1967
 McKinley School
 Mill Hill School - Established 1956, Reopened 1991
 North Stratfield School
 Osborn Hill School - Established 1957, Closed 1981, Reopened 1997.
 Riverfield School - Established 1962
 Roger Sherman School
 Stratfield School
 Timothy Dwight Schools

Middle schools 
 Fairfield Woods Middle School - Established 1955 as Fairfield Woods School
 Roger Ludlowe Middle School - Established 1998
 Tomlinson Middle School

High schools 
 Fairfield Ludlowe High School - Roger Ludlowe Senior High School Closed 1987, Reopened 2004 as FLHS
 Fairfield Warde High School - Established 1956 as Andrew Warde Senior High School

Private and parochial schools

Primary schools 
 Eagle Hill - Southport
 Fairfield Country Day School
 Hillel Academy
 Holy Family School - closed by the Diocese of Bridgeport at the end of the 2009-2010 academic year
 Our Lady of the Assumption School
 Pear Tree Point School
 St. Thomas Aquinas Catholic School
 The Unquowa School

Secondary schools 
Fairfield College Preparatory School, located on the campus of Fairfield University
Notre Dame Catholic High School

Universities 
Fairfield University
Sacred Heart University

References 

p

External links 
 Fairfield, CT Directory of Schools
 Official Website of the Fairfield Public Schools

Education in Fairfield County, Connecticut
Fairfield, Connecticut